Sanda University is a private university established in Shanghai in 1992. The university has around 10,000 students and 450 full-time academic staff, covering a range of academic disciplines including business, computer science, engineering, foreign languages, and management.

History

On June 26, 1992, a group of professors from Shanghai Jiaotong University, Peking University and Tsinghua University (three of the leading universities in China) initiated the notion of establishing a university with funding from the private sector.

Sanda University was thus founded on August 11, 1992. It was the first full-time private university offering programs leading to accredited certificates and diplomas in the country. On March 6, 2002, with the official ratification of the Chinese Ministry of Education, it became —  under the supervision of Shanghai Municipal Education Commission — the first full-time private comprehensive university providing undergraduate courses in China.

Following an ordinance from by the Ministry of Education in 2002, Sanda University changed its Chinese official name to Shanghai Sanda College, although the school still uses the English name "Sanda University."

Campuses

The main campus is on a  site in Pudong, in the south of Shanghai. A second campus, known as Guangbiao Institute, was established in 2002 and is in Jiashan County, Zhejiang province. It is named after Cao Guangbiao, one of the major donors to Sanda.

International exchange and cooperation

Since the founding of Sanda University, it has established exchange and cooperation relationships with overseas universities and research institutions, including Rider University, American University, University of Central Lancashire, University of Hull, University of Essex, University of Nevada, Las Vegas, Pennsylvania State University, Waseda University, Soka University, Kyoto University of Foreign Studies, and University of Social Sciences and Humanities.

Faculties

 School of Information Science and Technology  (信息科学与技术学院)
 Sheng Xiang School of Business 	
 School of Management
 School of Humanities
 School of Foreign Languages	
 School of Engineering
 School of Adult Education
 School of International Medical Technology

Presidents 
 Yang You (杨槱)
 Xie Xide (謝希德)
 Ni Weidou(倪维斗)
 Yuan Ji (袁济)
 Li Jin (李进)

Universities and colleges in Shanghai